Peter Scupham (24 February 1933 – 11 June 2022) was a British poet.

Life
Scupham was born in Bootle on 24 February 1933 to John and Dorothy Scupham. The family moved to Cambridgeshire and he was educated at the Perse School, Cambridge, and St George's School, Harpenden. After National Service with the RAOC, he studied at Emmanuel College, Cambridge. He taught at Skegness Grammar School, and then became Head of English at St. Christopher School, Letchworth.  His first marriage was to Carola Nance Braunholtz, the daughter of Hermann Braunholtz, CBE, Keeper of the Ethnographical Collections at the British Museum, with whom he had four children. His second wife was Margaret Steward. Together they restored a small derelict Elizabethan Manor house in Norfolk, where they put on plays and created a garden.  With John Mole he founded The Mandeville Press, a small press using traditional letterpress methods of printing. The Press produced hand-set editions of work by Geoffrey Grigson, Anthony Hecht, John Fuller, K. W. Gransden, and many others. Its archive is now in the British Library. For many years he ran an antiquarian book business - Mermaid Books - with Margaret Steward, specialising in English Literature, and trading by printed catalogue. Those catalogues were a welcome addition to any potential purchaser's breakfast, often causing them to chortle into their cornflakes at yet another scabrously disrespectful description of some long-dead literary figure. From 2020 onwards, Mermaid Books appeared to be in hiatus, and is now, alas, no longer trading.

His poetry was deftly formal, humane, richly textured and deeply civilized. He was able to see proofs of his final volume shortly before he died. Scupham died on 11 June 2022, at the age of 89.

Awards and honours
 1990 Elected Fellow of the Royal Society of Literature
 1996 Cholmondeley Award
 2009 A portrait of Scupham by photographer Jemimah Kuhfeld was acquired by the National Portrait Gallery, London for its permanent collection.

Works

Editor

Anthologies

References

1933 births
2022 deaths
Alumni of Emmanuel College, Cambridge
British male poets
Fellows of the Royal Society of Literature
Poets from Liverpool